
Gmina Pysznica is a rural gmina (administrative district) in Stalowa Wola County, Subcarpathian Voivodeship, in south-eastern Poland.

The boss is Łukasz Bajgierowicz.

Neighbouring gminas
Gmina Pysznica is bordered by the town of Stalowa Wola and by the gminas of Janów Lubelski, Jarocin, Modliborzyce, Nisko, Potok Wielki, Radomyśl nad Sanem, Ulanów and Zaklików.

Villages
Gmina Pysznica contains the villages of Bąków, Brandwica, Chłopska Wola, Jastkowice, Kłyżów, Krzaki, Olszowiec, Pysznica, Słomiana, Studzieniec and Sudoły.

References

Polish official population figures 2006

Pysznica
Stalowa Wola County